, best known as , is a Japanese company specializing in ramen noodles, through its Maruchan brand, seafood and frozen and refrigerated
foods. It is the fourth-largest transnational seafood corporation.

History
The company was established in 1953 by Kazuo Mori as a marine products exporter, domestic buyer and distributor. Entering the cold-storage business in 1955, it began producing and selling such processed marine food products as fish sausage in 1956.

Toyo Suisan and its consolidated subsidiaries subsequently expanded operations into other business fields, including instant noodles, fresh noodles and frozen foods.

In addition to consumer-direct foods, the company also markets a diverse range of food products for the commercial food service industry, including restaurants, speciality stores and industrial food services.

Operations
The company operates three solely owned companies in the United States: Maruchan, Inc. in Irvine, California, Maruchan Virginia, Inc. in Richmond, Virginia, and Maruchan Texas, Inc. in Von Ormy, Texas. They also have a joint venture with Ajinomoto Foods North America, Inc. in Portland, Oregon called Ajinomoto Toyo Frozen Noodles.

Products
Instant Noodles:
the series of Japanese instant cup noodles, represents one of the best-selling products, other products include: non-fried noodles, and vertical-type cup series of instant noodles

Fresh Noodles:	
Toyo Suisan’s fresh noodles command the top share of the fresh noodle market in Japan. Introduced in 1975, Sanshoku (“three pack”) Yakisoba  are the top-selling fresh noodles in Japan. Sanshoku Udon noodles (shelf life 15 days), and Mukashi Nagara No Chuka Soba noodles, are among the other products.

References

External links

Maruchan.co.jp - Official Website 

Food and drink companies based in Tokyo
Companies listed on the Tokyo Stock Exchange
Ramen
Food and drink companies established in 1953
1953 establishments in Japan